Charles F. Wennerstrum (October 11, 1889 – June 1, 1986) was an American lawyer who presided over and sharply criticized some of the Nuremberg war crimes trials after World War II.

Wennerstrum was born in Cambridge, Illinois and studied at Drake University, where he graduated in law in 1914. Elected county attorney of Lucas County in 1916, he served as a lieutenant of the U.S. Army in World War I. From January 1, 1941, until December 31, 1958, he served on the Iowa Supreme Court, where he was chief justice for two years. During that time, he also served as the presiding judge in the Hostages Case at the Subsequent Nuremberg Trials in Nuremberg, Germany in 1947/48, where some Generals of the German army were tried for having committed war crimes.

He assailed what he saw as the biased approaches of some prosecutors to the trials, suggesting that they were more interested in furthering their own careers than in seeing justice done; and asserting that far too many of them were Jews and consequently of suspect loyalty to the United States; "The whole atmosphere here is unwholesome.... Lawyers, clerks, interpreters and researchers are employed who became Americans only in recent years; whose backgrounds were embedded in Europe's hatreds and prejudices."

'The trials were to have convinced the Germans of the guilt of their leaders,' he said in 1948. 'They convinced the Germans merely that they lost the war to tough conquerors.'

After retiring from the Supreme Court of Iowa, he opened a private law practice in Des Moines.

References

External links

1889 births
1986 deaths
Iowa lawyers
Justices of the Iowa Supreme Court
Judges of the United States Nuremberg Military Tribunals
People from Cambridge, Illinois
20th-century American judges
Chief Justices of the Iowa Supreme Court
20th-century American lawyers